Concerts is a live double album by English avant-rock group Henry Cow, recorded at concerts in London, Italy, the Netherlands and Norway between September 1974 and October 1975. Sides one and two of the LP record consist of composed material while sides three and four contain improvised pieces.

The album includes Henry Cow's last John Peel Session, recorded in September 1975 and extracts from a concert with Robert Wyatt at the New London Theatre in May 1975. "Groningen" (recorded in September 1974) is part of an instrumental suite where the band improvised around fragments of an early version of Tim Hodgkinson's "Living in the Heart of the Beast" from In Praise of Learning (1975). Another performance of this suite (in full) later appeared in Halsteren on Volume 2: 1974–5 of The 40th Anniversary Henry Cow Box Set (2009).

The album cover art was done by Henry Cow roadie and sound mixer Maggie Thomas. She created it from a collage she made out of a cut-up Henry Cow poster she had designed a few months earlier.

CD reissues of the album include Henry Cow's tracks on Greasy Truckers Live at Dingwalls Dance Hall (1973), a double LP of an October 1973 Dingwalls concert, featuring Camel, Henry Cow, Global Village Trucking Company and Gong.

Concert venues and dates
"Beautiful as the Moon – Terrible as an Army with Banners", "Nirvana for Mice", "Ottawa Song", "Gloria Gloom", "Beautiful as the Moon (Reprise)": Peel Session, BBC Maida Vale Studio 4, 5 August 1975; recorded and mixed by Bob Conduct and Tony Wilson; broadcast by the BBC, 18 August 1975.
"Bad Alchemy", "Little Red Riding Hood Hits the Road": New London Theatre (with Robert Wyatt), 21 May 1975, mixed by Sarah Greaves.
"Ruins", "Udine": Palamostre Auditorium, Udine, Italy, 13 October 1975, mixed by Neil Sandford, recorded by Sandro Pascolo.
"Oslo": Høvikodden Arts Centre, Oslo, Norway, 25 July 1975, record and mixed by Jack Balchin and Harold Clark.
"Groningen", "Groningen Again": Vera Club, Groningen, the Netherlands, 28 September 1974, mixed by Sarah Greaves.
"Off the Map", "Cafe Royal", "Keeping Warm in Winter", "Sweet Heart of Mine": Greasy Truckers Live at Dingwalls Dance Hall, recorded at The Manor, 4 November 1973 by Henry Cow and Tom Newman (CD releases only).

Composed material
The composed material (with the exception of "Ottawa Song") originally appeared on the following albums:
Matching Mole: Matching Mole's Little Red Record (1972) – "Gloria Gloom"
Henry Cow: Legend (1973) – "Nirvana for Mice"
Henry Cow: Unrest (1974) – "Ruins"
Robert Wyatt: Rock Bottom (1974) – "Little Red Riding Hood Hit the Road"
Slapp Happy/Henry Cow: Desperate Straights (1975) – "Bad Alchemy"
Henry Cow/Slapp Happy: In Praise of Learning (1975) – "Beautiful as the Moon – Terrible as an Army with Banners"

CD reissues
In 1995, East Side Digital Records reissued Concerts as a double CD with four extra tracks. The extra tracks came from Greasy Truckers Live at Dingwalls Dance Hall (1973), a double LP of an October 1973 concert performed by Camel, Henry Cow, Global Village Trucking Company and Gong, each band contributing to one side of the double album. Henry Cow's contribution, however, was actually recorded a week later at The Manor Studios because a power failure at the event had delayed the start of the concert and a 2am curfew reduced Henry Cow's set (billed last) to ten minutes. At the Manor, Henry Cow improvised their Greasy Truckers set to tape and mixed the tracks in a single session. An outtake from this recording session, "Bellycan" was released on the 1991 CD-release of Legend.

In October 2006, Recommended Records released a remastered version of Concerts, which included the Greasy Truckers set, on a double CD. The original dynamics of "Oslo" were restored, which had been compromised to fit it onto side three of the double LP. The remastering was done by Bob Drake in March 2006. An accompanying booklet included a 1977 interview with Henry Cow in Sweden, and a seven-day extract from the "November/December 1977 Road Diary" by Chris Cutler.

Track listing

Original LP release

2006 double CD release

2006 double CD release notes
"Off the Map", "Café Royal", "Keeping Warm in Winter" and "Sweet Heart of Mine" are bonus tracks from Henry Cow's set on Greasy Truckers Live at Dingwalls Dance Hall (1973).

Singles
"In Concerto" (1977, 33⅓ rpm 7" single, Gong, Italy) – included with issue 4/4 of the Italian magazine, Gong
"Beautiful as the Moon – Terrible as an Army with Banners" (Frith, Cutler)
"Udine" (Henry Cow)

Personnel
Henry Cow
Lindsay Cooper – bassoon, flute, oboe, recorder, piano
Chris Cutler – drums, piano
Dagmar Krause – voice, piano
Fred Frith – guitar, piano, violin, xylophone
John Greaves – bass guitar, voice, celeste, piano
Tim Hodgkinson – organ, clarinet, alto saxophone, piano (Greasy Truckers set, CD release only)
Geoff Leigh (Greasy Truckers set, CD release only) – tenor and soprano saxophone, recorder, flute, clarinet

Guest musician
Robert Wyatt – vocals ("Bad Alchemy" and "Little Red Riding Hood Hits the Road")

Production
Henry Cow – producers
Maggie Thomas – cover art
David Vorhaus – original LP mastering (Kaleidophon, London)
Bob Drake – CD remastering (Studio Midi Pyrenees, France)

See also
Henry Cow Box (2006)

References

Works cited

External links
Concerts review by Brad Glanden at All About Jazz, 2006

1976 live albums
Henry Cow albums
Peel Sessions recordings
Caroline Records live albums
Recommended Records live albums
Live free improvisation albums